The Mongolian Latin script (Mongolian Cyrillic: , ;;) was officially adopted in Mongolia in 1931. In 1939, a second version of the Latin alphabet was introduced but not widely used, and was replaced by the Cyrillic script in 1941.

History 
In the early 1930s, under the influence of latinisation in the Soviet Union, a draft alphabet on a Latin basis was developed in the Mongolian People's Republic.  This alphabet was used in several articles in the Ynen newspaper, but did not receive official status.

On 1 February 1 1941, Mongolia officially switched to a modified Latin alphabet, which was successfully used for some time to print books and newspapers.  However, two months later, on March 25, this decision was canceled.  According to official explanations, the adopted writing system was not well thought out: it did not cover all the sounds of the Mongolian language and was difficult to use.

The adoption of the Cyrillic alphabet occurred almost simultaneously with the Cyrillization in the Soviet Union, therefore, the rejection of the Latin alphabet could have been due to political considerations.

In the Mongolian version of the Latin alphabet, there were additional letters ɵ, ç, ş and ƶ;  Y corresponded to the Cyrillic .

The letters f, h, p, v were rarely used except in Russian loanwords, and q, w, and x were almost never used.

Despite being neither widely promoted nor having any official status, Mongolians were increasingly using Latin script on smartphones and social networking services .

In 1975, preparations began in China for the romanization of Mongolian writing in Mongol areas based on the pinyin system used for Mandarin Chinese. According to the plan, the Latin alphabet should have been introduced in 1977, but the death of Mao Zedong and the changes in domestic policy that had begun did not allow the project to materialize.  This system forms the basis of the SASM/GNC romanization of Mongolian that has been used in China to transcribe personal names and toponyms since 1978.

Characters 

First Latin alphabet was using "y" as feminine "u", with additional feminine "o" ("ɵ") and with additional consonants "ç" for "ch", "ş" for "sh" and "ƶ" for "j", it successfully served in printing books and newspapers. A few of the letters (f, k, p, v) were rarely used, being found only in borrowings, while q, w and x were excluded altogether. "j" is used for vowel combinations of the [ja] type. Letter "c" is used for the sound [ts] and "k" is used for the sound [h]. The first version was inspired by the Yanalif script used for the Soviet Union's Turkic languages.

The second version of Latin alphabet made few minor changes to make the way it works to look more familiar to European languages. That change was including replacement of "y" by "ü", "ɵ" by "ö", "ƶ" by "j", "j" by "y" and also "k" by "x" in native words. Also reduced the number of letters in the alphabet by erasing "ç" "ş" and write them as a combination of ch and sh. And the rest of the alphabet and orthography kept same.

List of characters 

The unaspirated stops are often realized as voiced .

Text samples

Orthography 

The orthography of the Mongolian Latin is based on the orthography of the Classical Mongolian script. It preserves short final vowels. It does not drop unstressed vowels in the closing syllables when the word is conjugated. The suffixes and inflections without long or i-coupled vowels are made open syllables ending with a vowel, which is harmonized with the stressed vowel. The rule for the vowel harmony for unstressed vowels is similar to that of the Mongolian Cyrillic. It does not use consonant combinations to denote new consonant sounds.  For both of the version, letter "b" is used both in the beginning and in the middle of the word. Because it phonetically assimilates into sound , no ambiguity is caused.

See also 

 Latinisation in the Soviet Union
 Mongolian writing systems
Mongolian script
Galik alphabet
Todo alphabet
ʼPhags-pa script
Horizontal square script
Soyombo script
Mongolian Latin alphabet
SASM/GNC romanization § Mongolian
Mongolian Cyrillic alphabet
Mongolian transliteration of Chinese characters

Mongolian Braille
 Mongolian Sign Language
 Mongolian name

References 

Latin script
Latin alphabets